Omak Apang (born 11 March 1971) is an Indian politician from Arunachal Pradesh. He was born to parents of Adi descent. He is the son of politician Gegong Apang, who served as the Chief Minister of Arunachal Pradesh between 1980 and 1999 and again between 2003 and 2007. He served as the minister of state for tourism in Second Vajpayee ministry as its youngest minister in 1998–99. He was a member of the Bharatiya Janata Party, Arunachal Congress as well as the Indian National Congress and currently, a member of Bharatiya Janata Party after resigning from the primary and active membership of the Indian National Congress in February 2014 and joining the BJP on 20 February 2014.

He was member of Parliament from Arunachal West (Lok Sabha constituency) in 1998 but in 1999, Apang once again stood from Arunachal West came second with 70 760 votes, 30,07% in that constituency.

References

External links 
 Biographical Sketch at indiapress.org

Living people
1971 births
People from Upper Siang district
People from Yingkiong
Arunachal Congress politicians
Indian National Congress politicians
Bharatiya Janata Party politicians from Arunachal Pradesh
Arunachal Pradesh MLAs 2009–2014
Union ministers of state of India
Lok Sabha members from Arunachal Pradesh
India MPs 1998–1999